The Marching Jayhawks, is a 325-piece marching band consisting of woodwinds, brass, percussion, and color guard, representing the University of Kansas in Lawrence, Kansas. The band performs at all home football games and occasionally travels to away games.  They also send smaller ensembles to pep rallies around the Kansas City area.  The band marches in parades on campus and in downtown Lawrence.  The volleyball and basketball pep bands play at all home games and will often travel for post-season play.

History
In 1887, Stuart O. Henry put together a small, 12-member brass ensemble at the University of Kansas. The band, however, didn't really take off until the early 20th century when, in 1906, the band obtained uniforms, and in 1907 got a director, Joseph C. McCanles, who was a member of the faculty. In 1972, women became a regular part of the band. In 1989, the John Philip Sousa Foundation awarded the prestigious Sudler Trophy to the University of Kansas Band. In 1994, Sports Illustrated named the Jayhawk band as one of the top ten college marching bands.

Directors of Bands
 1907-1933: Joseph C. McCanles
 1933-1968: Russell L. Wiley
 1968-1970: Kenneth Bloomquist
 1970-1971: Interim George Boberg
 1971-2002: Robert E. Foster
 2002-2007: John P. Lynch
 2007-Spring 2010: Scott Weiss
 Fall 2010–present: Paul W. Popiel

Directors of Athletic Bands
 2003-2006: James Hudson
 2007-2011: David Clemmer
 2011–Present: Matthew O. Smith

Pre-game and other shows
At home football games, the Marching Jayhawks perform both an opening pregame show and a halftime show that changes throughout the season. The pregame program begins with the members of the band sprinting down the stairs of the northern bowl of Memorial Stadium. The band runs onto the field to a cadence by the drum line. One of KU's fight songs, "Fighting Jayhawk," is then performed. The band is then joined by a group of the Rock Chalk Dancers, KU's dance team, for the historic "Sunflower Song" and accompanying sunflower-inspired drill. The "Kansas Song" is then played as the Marching Jayhawks perform their historic KU counter march. The band then performs the National Anthem, “Crimson and the Blue” (the KU alma mater), and the Rock Chalk Chant. The Marching Jayhawks conclude with the university's official fight song, "I'm a Jayhawk." Many of the elements and formations of the pregame have been present for decades.

Halftime shows differ from game to game. Most halftime shows often include popular music or commemorate events such as September 11 or Veteran's Day. The formations for these shows are more free-form than the regimented pregame show. They are also shorter, consisting of three songs or medleys, often featuring new hits from the previous year or well-known pop tunes.

References

External links

Big 12 Conference marching bands
Marching Jayhawks
Musical groups from Kansas
Musical groups established in 1887
1887 establishments in Kansas